Augustus Island (Worrorra: Wurroolgu), is an uninhabited island off the Kimberley coast of Western Australia, within the Shire of Wyndham-East Kimberley.

It is at the Southern end of the Bonaparte Archipelago.

Although most of the islands in the Kimberley are unallocated DEC crown land, Jungulu is one of the islands near the former Kunmunya Mission which
are included in Reserve 23079 for Use and Benefit of Aborigines.

The island is uninhabited and contains no known feral animals.

Many flora and fauna were isolated from the mainland when sea levels rose and many populations are found intact on the island. The island provides ideal habitat for the Nabarlek, also known as the Little Rock-Wallaby, with the weathered sandstone forming deep fissures.

The golden bandicoot is another vulnerable species that is resident on the island, the last recorded sighting being in 2003. This species favours the Warton sandstone and the heathland on dissected sandstone.

Notes

References

Bonaparte Archipelago
Islands of the Kimberley (Western Australia)